Coiled Tubing Drilling (CTD) is a drilling method that combines coiled tubing and directional drilling. It uses a mud motor to create a system for reservoirs.

Operations
CTD has been used in regions such as Alaska, Canada, United Arab Emirates, Oman and Saudi Arabia. Typical applications include depleted wells, unconventional gas shale, underground coal gasification and coal bed methane.

See also
 Bottom hole assembly
 Underbalanced drilling

References

External links
 ICoTA - Intervention & Coiled Tubing Association
 NOV - Coiled Tubing Drilling Equipment

Drilling technology